is a town located in Yamanashi Prefecture, Japan. ,  the town had an estimated population of 15,125 in 6323 households, and a population density of 140 persons per km2.

Geography
Fujikawa is in the southwestern in Yamanashi Prefecture, bordered by the 2000-meter Kushigatayama to the west, and the Fuji River to the east. In terms of land use, 81% of the town area is forested.

Neighboring municipalities
Yamanashi Prefecture
Minami-Alps
Minobu
Hayakawa
Ichikawamisato

Climate
The town has a climate characterized by characterized by hot and humid summers, and relatively mild winters (Köppen climate classification Cfa).  The average annual temperature in Fujikawa is 13.7 °C. The average annual rainfall is 1415 mm with September as the wettest month. The temperatures are highest on average in August, at around 25.9 °C, and lowest in January, at around 2.0 °C.

Demographics
Per Japanese census data, the population of Fujikawa has declined by roughly one-third over the past 60 years.

History
During the Edo period, all of Kai Province was tenryō territory under direct control of the Tokugawa shogunate. During the cadastral reform of the early Meiji period on April 1, 1889, Minamikoma District within Yamanashi Prefecture was created and organized into 22 villages. Kajikazawa village was raised to town status on August 1, 1898 and Masuho on April 3, 1951.

In 2003, a proposal was raised to merge the towns of Masuho and Kajikazawa with the towns of Ichikawadaimon, Mitama and Rokugō from Nishiyatsushiro District into a new city, or to merge with neighboring Minami-Alps. The proposal was not successful, and instead the three towns in Nishiyatsushiro merged to form Ichikawamisato on October 1, 2005, whereas Masuho and Kajikazawa merged to form Fujikawa on March 8, 2010.

Economy
The economy of Fujikawa is primarily based on forestry and agriculture.

Education
Fujikawa has three public elementary schools and two public junior high schools operated by the town government. The town does not have a high school.

Transportation

Railway
The town has no passenger rail service. The nearest train stations are Kajikazawaguchi Station or Ichikawa-Daimon Station in Ichikawamisato, Yamanashi.

Highway
 Chūbu-Ōdan Expressway

Notable people from Fujikawa
Kunio Yonenaga – shogi master
Masaki Fukai – professional football player
Yu Hasegawa – professional football player
Yoshifumi Kashiwa – professional football player

References

External links

Official Website 

 
Towns in Yamanashi Prefecture